A Vision of Britain: A Personal View of Architecture is a 1989 book written by Charles III, then the Prince of Wales.

Summary
The Prince of Wales gives his views on the buildings in the United Kingdom.

Documentary
Before the book was released, a BBC documentary was made called HRH Prince Of Wales: A Vision Of Britain. In the documentary the Prince visited buildings in the U.K including Birmingham City Centre and gave his views on the buildings.

References

External links
 Prince Charles slams 1980s architecture in archive film at BBC News

Architecture books
1989 non-fiction books
Books by Charles III
Doubleday (publisher) books